Belgrave railway station is the terminus of the suburban electrified Belgrave line in Victoria, Australia. It serves the eastern Melbourne suburb of Belgrave, and the current station opened on 19 February 1962.

History

Narrow gauge
Belgrave station originally opened on 18 December 1900 as Monbulk, and was renamed Belgrave on 21 November 1904. The station was on the Upper Ferntree Gully – Gembrook narrow gauge line.

Following a landslide between Selby and Menzies Creek in the previous year, on 30 April 1954, the station closed, along with the rest of the line. From 9 April 1955 until 23 February 1958, the Victorian Railways resumed operations between Upper Ferntree Gully and Belgrave, which was provided under a guarantee against losses by a citizens committee.

On 21 July 1962, a new station for the narrow gauge line was provided, along with the re-opening of the line as far as Menzies Creek. The Belgrave narrow gauge station is the starting point for the Puffing Billy Railway, and is located approximately 100m north of the current station, which is accessible by a short footpath.

Broad gauge
Belgrave station opened in its current format on 19 February 1962, after the line from Upper Ferntree Gully was converted to broad gauge and electrified. The rebuilt station is located further down the line than the original narrow gauge station, which was approximately where the current station car park is located.

In the early hours of 23 November 1989, Hitachi carriage 219M was destroyed in an arson attack whilst stabled at the station.

On 2 July 1996, Belgrave was upgraded to a Premium Station.

In 2018, the Victorian Government announced it would fund the construction of a multi-deck park and ride facility, along with a new bridge, to connect the station to the Burwood Highway at the up end of the station. During the 2018/2019 financial year, the station had a patronage of 389,750.

Platforms and services
Belgrave has one island platform with two faces. It is served by Belgrave line trains.

Platform 1:
  all stations and limited express services to Flinders Street; all stations shuttle services to Ringwood

Platform 2:
  all stations and limited express services to Flinders Street; all stations shuttle services to Ringwood

Transport links
Ventura Bus Lines operates six routes to and from Belgrave station, under contract to Public Transport Victoria:
 : to Lilydale station
 : to Oakleigh station
 : to Olinda (off-peak only)
 : to Gembrook
 : to Belgrave South
 : to Upwey station

References

External links
 
 Melway map at street-directory.com.au

Premium Melbourne railway stations
Railway stations in Melbourne
Railway stations in Australia opened in 1900
Railway stations closed in 1954
Railway stations in Australia opened in 1962
Railway stations in the Shire of Yarra Ranges